The 2024 United States presidential election in Georgia is scheduled to take place on Tuesday, November 5, 2024, as part of the 2024 United States elections in which all 50 states plus the District of Columbia will participate. Georgia voters will choose electors to represent them in the Electoral College via a popular vote. The state of Georgia has 16 electoral votes in the Electoral College, following reapportionment due to the 2020 United States census in which it neither gained nor lost a seat. Georgia is considered to be a crucial swing state in 2024.

Incumbent Democratic president Joe Biden, who won the state in the 2020 election, stated that he intends to run for reelection to a second term. If he carries the state again, he will become the first Democratic Party presidential candidate since Jimmy Carter in 1980 to carry the state in two consecutive presidential elections.

Primary elections

Republican primary

The Georgia Republican primary is scheduled to be held on March 26, 2024.

General election

Polling
Joe Biden vs. Donald Trump

Joe Biden vs. Ron DeSantis

See also 
 United States presidential elections in Georgia
 2024 United States presidential election
 2024 Democratic Party presidential primaries
 2024 Republican Party presidential primaries
 2024 United States elections

Notes

Partisan clients

References 

Georgia
2024
Presidential